Arasilankumari is a 1961 Indian Tamil-language historical adventure film directed by A. S. A. Sami and A. Kasilingam, and produced by M. Somasundaram under Jupiter Pictures. An adaptation of the 1952 film Scaramouche, itself based on a 1921 novel of the same name, it stars M. G. Ramachandran, Padmini and Rajasulochana. The film was originally directed by Sami, and completed by Kasilingam. It was released on 1 January 1961, and failed commercially.

Plot 

Arivazhagan has a sister Anbukarasi. Anbukarasi falls in love with Vetrivelan, who is commander-in-chief of the royal army, but he tells Anbukarasi and Arivazhagan that he is just an ordinary citizen of the kingdom and marries Anbukarasi. Arivazhagan leaves on a mission after his sister's marriage. After some time, Vetrivelan deserts his wife and child and returns to the palace. He starts plotting against the royal family. How his plans are set at naught by the hero and how his wife fights for him against her own brother form the rest of the film.

Cast 
M. G. Ramachandran as Arivazhagan
Padmini as  Anbukarasi
Rajasulochana as Azhagurani
R. Muthuraman as Pulikesi
M. N. Nambiar as Vetrivelan
K. A. Thangavelu as Kalaimani
Sandow M. M. A. Chinnappa Thevar (guest appearance)
R. Nagendra Rao
S. A. Ashokan as Manimara Bhoopathi
T. A. Mathuram
M. Saroja as Annam

Production 
Arasilankumari was adapted from the 1952 film version of the Rafael Sabatini novel Scaramouche. It took as long as five years to complete. The film was originally directed by A. S. A. Sami, who had differences with the cast and crew; he was replaced by A. Kasilingam who completed the film. This was the final film produced by Jupiter Pictures.

Soundtrack 
The music was composed by G. Ramanathan. Lyrics were by Pattukkottai Kalyanasundaram, Kannadasan, Ku. Ma. Balasubramaniam, K. S. Gopalakrishnan, R. Pazhanichami and Muthukoothan. The song "Chinna Payale" was later adapted into "Thiruttu Payale" for the 2006 film of the same name.

Release and reception 
Arasilankumari was released on 1 January 1961. Kanthan of Kalki appreciated Nambiar's two contrasting performances of the same character. The film was not commercially successful, with historian Randor Guy attributing it to the prolonged production schedule.

References

Bibliography

External links 
 

1960s historical adventure films
1960s Tamil-language films
1961 films
Films based on British novels
Films scored by G. Ramanathan
Indian historical adventure films
Jupiter Pictures films